WYLI-LP (93.7 FM) was a radio station in Lake Wylie, South Carolina, owned by Lake Wylie Community Radio Project.  The station played a variety music format for the Charlotte, North Carolina, area.

The station was assigned the WYLI-LP call letters by the Federal Communications Commission on March 10, 2003. The FCC cancelled the station's license on January 31, 2008.

References

External links
 

YLI-LP
YLI-LP
Defunct radio stations in the United States
YLI-LP
Radio stations established in 2003
Radio stations disestablished in 2008
2003 establishments in South Carolina
2008 disestablishments in South Carolina
YLI-LP